Dialling (dialing in US English) is the action of initiating a telephone call by operating the rotary dial or the telephone keypad of a telephone.

Rotary dial

Prior to Strowgers invention of SXS, rotary switch in 1891, telephone connections involved cranking a handle to generate a voltage that operated a bell on the remote operator's board; the operator would then get on the line to the subscriber and speak to them, they would then raise a voltage on the recipient's phone, alerting them of an incoming call. When this was acknowledged, the operator would patch the two subscribers together using a lead terminating in a jack plug.

Under Strowger's system, which was first introduced commercially in La Porte, Indiana, the number was dialled using two telegraph keys. The subscriber tapped eight times on one, then three times on the second to 'dial' the number 83. When this was introduced into Albion, New York, in 1899, the keys had been replaced by a rotary dial.

National adoption

From 1912, the British General Post Office, which also operated the British telephone system, installed several automatic telephone exchanges from several vendors in trials at Darlington on 10 October 1914 (rotary system), Fleetwood (relay exchange from Sweden), Grimsby (Siemens), Hereford (Lorimer) and Leeds (Strowger). The BPO selected the Strowger switches for small and medium cities and towns. However, the selection of switching systems for London and other large cities was not decided until the 1920s, when the Director telephone system was adopted. The Director systems used SXS switches for destination routing and number translation facilities similar to the register used in common-control exchanges. Using similar equipment as in the rest of the network was deemed beneficial and the equipment could be manufactured in Britain.

Touch tone dial

Introduced to the public in 1963 by AT&T, Touch-Tone dialing greatly shortened the time of initiating a telephone call. It also enabled direct signaling from a telephone across the long-distance network using audio-frequency tones, which was impossible with the rotary dials that generated digital direct current pulses that had to be decoded by the local central office.

The touch tone key pad has sixteen keys laid out in a four-by-four matrix. Each key produces a combination of two audible tone frequencies, determined by their position on the pad. Each column and row has a distinct frequency assigned, thus generating a total of sixteen dual-tone multi-frequency (DTMF) signals. Early keypads only used the keys with the digits 1 through 9 and 0. The extra keys were intended for computer data entry, business functions, and military applications. By 1967, the keys with the asterisk (*) and hash (#) were added on all subscriber telephone sets. The keys A, B, C, D were used as priority signals (FO, F, I, and P) in the Automatic Voice Network (AUTOVON) of the US military.

Initial pushbutton designs employed mechanical switches, so that each button activated certain combinations of capacitors and inductors of an oscillator, while later versions used semiconductor logic chips to synthesize the frequencies. The tones are decoded by the receiver to determine the keys pressed by the user.

For example, the key 1 produces a superimposition of tones of 697 and 1209 hertz (Hz).

References

Telephony equipment